Río Piedras is a populous district of San Juan, and former town and municipality of Puerto Rico, which was merged with the municipality of San Juan in 1951. The district today is composed of various barrios (these are the primary legal divisions of municipalities in Puerto Rico) such as Pueblo and Universidad. The historic town was founded in 1714 as El Roble, it was given municipality rights in 1823, and since 1903 it has been the home of the University of Puerto Rico's main campus, earning the popular name of Ciudad Universitaria (similar to college town) today. The downtown and historic center of Río Piedras is officially known as the Pueblo barrio of the municipality of San Juan.

Name 
In addition to being the name of the barrio and district, Río Piedras (Piedras River) is also the name of a river that crosses the district. Río Piedras was also the name of the former municipality of Puerto Rico (1823-1950).

History 

The area where Río Piedras is located today was previously settled by the Taíno, and archaeological sites have been uncovered nearby in Carolina. The town was founded as El Roble and officially recognized by Spanish Governor Juan de Rivera in 1714. It was settled on the intersection of the Piedras River and the Juan Méndez Creek (part of the Puerto Nuevo River basin). The town eventually adopted the name of that river, Río Piedras, and was proclaimed a municipality in 1823, when the city hall and plaza (main town square) were built.

During the nineteenth century, most of its territory was used for agricultural and livestock-raising purposes. Sugar cane, cotton and coffee were some of the goods produced during this era at the municipality. A road connecting Río Piedras to San Juan was built during this time, along with the first church, Iglesia Nuestra Señora del Pilar, at the site of the modern town plaza. The Camino Real, precursor to the Carretera Central, connected Río Piedras with Caguas and to southern Puerto Rico, was also built before the end of the century. Its location along the Camino Real between the walled city of San Juan and the rest of the island turned Río Piedras into a commercial hub and junction between the Spanish colonial government and the rest of Puerto Rico.

The University of Puerto Rico was founded in Río Piedras on May 12, 1903 with funds diverted from the former Escuela Normal Industrial (Normal Industrial School). The University of Puerto Rico, Río Piedras Campus today one of the largest universities in Puerto Rico. The university was a central part of the commercial and residential development of Río Piedras. The University Botanical Gardens are also located in Río Piedras.

Incorporation into San Juan 
The municipality of Río Piedras became part of the capital city of San Juan on July 1, 1951, after the approval of Project 177 by the House of Representatives of Puerto Rico. Following the annexation of Río Piedras, the city of San Juan, quadrupled its former size, becoming the largest city in Puerto Rico. With a population of 143,989 in 1950, Río Piedras was the most populous municipality in Puerto Rico before its consolidation with San Juan. The last mayor of the municipality of Río Piedras was Ángeles Méndez de López Corver. The former downtown area of the municipality is today part of the barrio (district) of Pueblo in San Juan, more popularly known as Río Piedras Antiguo (Old Río Piedras) and Río Piedras Pueblo (downtown Río Piedras), and it still preserves its former city hall, town square or plaza, and its cathedral, Catedral de San Juan Bautista.

Symbols

Flag 
The flag of Río Piedras consists of a yellow cloth with a wavy blue stripe. The stripe has small white stones crossing it, and symbolizes the river that gave its name to the former town. The yellow background represents the sun, progress, and the future.

Geography and climate 
The region is mostly flat due to its location in the Northern Coastal Plains of the island. The highest regions are located at the south, mainly in the Caimito and Cupey barrios. The Río Piedras (or Piedras River) which gives name to the area crosses the region.

Cityscape

Barrios 
By 1948, Río Piedras had the following 12 urban barrios:

 Buen Consejo 
 Capetillo 
 El Cinco 
 Gobernador Piñero 
 Hato Rey Central 
 Hato Rey Norte 
 Hato Rey Sur 
 Oriente 
 Río Piedras Antiguo 
 Sabana Llana Norte 
 Sabana Llana Sur
 Universidad 

Buen Consejo, Capetillo, and Río Piedras Antiguo made up the original urban area of the municipality of Río Piedras.

The rural zone, 42% of Río Piedras in 1948, were the following six barrios:

 Caimito
 Cupey
 Monacillo
 Quebrada Arenas
 Sabana Llana Rural 
 Tortugo

Demographics

Tourism 
Tourism spots in Río Piedras include:

 The Río Piedras campus of the University of Puerto Rico (and its theater, bell tower and museums)
 , which is a cultural center
 Heladería Georgetti, an iconic ice-cream shop
 El Churro Bar, popular Mexican taqueria and bar
 Plaza del Mercado de Río Piedras, the historic marketplace building in downtown Río Piedras
 El Boricua, a popular gathering place for locals and tourists alike

Government 
Río Piedras first mayor was Juan de la Cruz in 1814. The last mayor of the municipality of Río Piedras was Ángeles Méndez de López Corver.

The Puerto Rico Department of Corrections and Rehabilitation operates the Hogar Intermedio para Mujeres in Río Piedras, which opened in 1996.

Education 
Río Piedras is perhaps more known for being the site of the main campus of the University of Puerto Rico. Located in downtown Río Piedras, the university has more than 20,000 students enrolled and a faculty of more than 1,000.

Other universities located in what was known as Río Piedras are the Polytechnic University of Puerto Rico and the Interamerican University of Puerto Rico, Metropolitan Campus.

Río Piedras also has several public and private schools distributed through several regions. Public education is handled by the Puerto Rico Department of Education.

Transportation 
Río Piedras is served by the Tren Urbano metro system with stations at the University of Puerto Rico and Río Piedras in downtown Río Piedras. Even though these two stations are considered the current stations at Río Piedras, most of the stops of the train in the municipality of San Juan are located in areas that were part of the municipality of Río Piedras prior to 1951.

Culture 

At the heart of Río Piedras lies the Avenida José de Diego, a one-kilometer pedestrianized street with stores and shops. The Río Piedras Plaza del Mercado (the old marketplace) is the largest of its kind on the island and features a series of shops that offer goods and services, and it is also popular with students of the university.

Ponce de León Avenue is popular with bookstores and small theaters and with students, faculty, and intellectuals in the community.

Notable people 
 Luis Torres Díaz lived in the city.
 La India
 Tito Nieves
 Frank H. Wadsworth

Gallery

See also 

 University of Puerto Rico, Río Piedras Campus
 Vilma Reyes
 Humberto Vidal explosion
 List of communities in Puerto Rico

References

External links 
 Río Piedras, Puerto Rico - AreciboWeb 

 
Districts of San Juan, Puerto Rico
1714 establishments in the Spanish Empire